The Wall is located in the Teton Range in the U.S. state of Wyoming, running for more than  along the western border of Grand Teton National Park. The peak is on the border of Grand Teton National Park and the Jedediah Smith Wilderness of Caribou-Targhee National Forest. This high point, near the northern terminus of the cliff, is  WSW of South Teton and overlooks Snowdrift Lake.

References

Mountains of Grand Teton National Park
Mountains of Wyoming
Mountains of Teton County, Wyoming